Wanda Group, or the  Dalian Wanda Group, is a Chinese multinational conglomerate founded in Dalian, Liaoning and headquartered in Beijing. It is a private property developer and owner of Wanda Cinemas and the Hoyts Group.

With investments within Mainland China and globally, the Dalian Wanda group has investments across many industries including construction, entertainment, media, industrial manufacturing, financial services, high technology, hospitality, real estate, retail, healthcare, and sports. It ranked 380th on the Fortune Global 500 List in 2017. Also in 2017, its assets amounted to 700 billion yuan and an annual revenue 227.4 billion yuan ($35.29 billion). Wanda Cultural Industry Group is one of China's cultural enterprises, includes movie theaters as well as sports and film production assets, and contributed 28% or $10.85 billion to overall revenue. Wanda Group ranks 28th on the 2020 China Top 500 Private Enterprises List.

History 
The company was founded in Dalian, Liaoning, in 1988 as a residential real estate company by businessman Wang Jianlin. Incorporated in 1992, the company was "one of the first shareholding companies in the People's Republic of China" after the economic reform. The company started to use the name "Wanda" since then. "Wàn" means ten thousand, and "Dá" means to reach or attain. In combination, the company's name is a slogan aspiring to be able to reach everything.

Diversification push
Since 2005,  Dalian Wanda and other prominent Chinese real estate companies such as Evergrande have made numerous forays into "alternative, income-generating businesses away from the property market". The Financial Times noted that Dalian Wanda was the "most aggressive" company in pursuing this strategy, pointing to its 2012 acquisition of U.S. cinema chain AMC Theatres and 2013 purchase of British yachtmaker Sunseeker. It noted that it was also "building theme parks across China, and has a joint venture with Tencent and Baidu to set up an e-commerce platform".

Dalian Wanda acquired the American cinema operator AMC Theatres in May 2012 for $2.6 billion, the largest Chinese acquisition of an American company to that date. The acquisition went through successfully in August 2012, making Wanda Cinemas the world's largest cinema operator. As of 2016, Wanda owns approximately 6% of all commercial movie screens in China, and about 13% in the U.S. The company made major changes in AMC theater design and layout, including generously sized reclining seats, waiter service, and expanded food and drink offerings. Ticket sales at AMC nearly doubled in the 18 months following the acquisition, and by the end of 2014 Wanda had reaped a reported profit of about US$900 million. It no longer has control as of 2021.

In June 2013, Dalian Wanda planned to invest $1.1 billion to develop a new five-star hotel in London next to the Thames River in Vauxhall, South London, as part of the Nine Elms regeneration. Mayor of London Boris Johnson welcomed this move. It is building "Western Europe’s tallest residential building". Plans were scrapped in 2015,

In June 2013, Dalian Wanda acquired Sunseeker International, a British luxury yacht manufacturer used in the James Bond movies, for $500 million. This acquisition gave them a 92% stake in the company.

In January 2015, Dalian Wanda purchased an office building in Sydney, Australia, from Blackstone Group for around $327 million. The company is "aggressively expanding overseas to move away from China's property market, which has been hit by a slowing economy".

In June 2015, Wanda Cinemas announced that it had acquired Australian cinema chain Hoyts. In Chile it was acquired by Cinépolis, in Uruguay by Life Cinemas, and in Argentina by Cinemark.

In November 2015, it was announced that a holding company, Wanda Film Holdings, will be established to house the entirety of Wanda Group's portfolio of film-related assets.

Dalian Wanda developed a skyscraper in Chicago initially called Wanda Vista, designed by the Chicago-based architect Jeanne Gang, which would become the city's third-tallest building and the tallest building in the world designed by a woman, passing Chicago's Aqua Tower (also designed by Jeanne Gang).

On January 11, 2016, Wanda Group acquired the American film production and mass media company Legendary Entertainment for $3.5 billion. The acquisition of Legendary made Wanda Film Holdings the highest revenue-generating film production company in the world.

In May 2016, Wanda Group acquired Propaganda GEM and Hoolai Games. The Entertainment Marketing and product placement agency becomes part of Wanda Group's focus on entertainment but also Hollywood content.

Wanda Group also owns 20% of Mtime, a Chinese film website.

In September 2016, Wanda announced a major partnership with Sony Pictures Entertainment, in which it will take minority investments in a number of upcoming releases. Sony stated that Wanda planned to "highlight the China element in the films in which it invests". The deal came in the wake of Wanda's failed bid to acquire a stake in Paramount Pictures.

In November 2016, Wanda announced it would buy the television production company Dick Clark Productions for around $1 billion. However, the deal fell through, with Bloomberg citing increasing regulation of Chinese investments both domestically and in the United States, and Deadline.com citing financial struggles in Wanda's real estate business.

In May 2017, Wanda announced it would invest $3.3B by 2024 in EuropaCity, a mega-project near Paris' Charles de Gaulle airport that will boast a theme park, attractions, cultural exhibitions, retail shops, outdoor sports venues and restaurants over about 200 acres. It's Wanda's biggest-ever single project in Europe. Its other offshore real estate interests include a major development on the banks of London's River Thames and plans for an industrial park in India at a $10B investment.

In July 2017, Wanda launched the grand opening of Danzhai Wanda Village, a $200 million tourism project help alleviate Wanda's poverty.

In July 2017, it was reported that the group was selling a number of theme parks and hotels for $9.3 billion to Chinese property developer Sunac.

In August, Wanda invested $2.14 billion in health care industry and launched the Healthcare Group. Wanda cooperates with International Hospital Group.

August 9, 2017, Dalian Wanda Group announced acquisitions of Wanda Culture Travel Innovation Group and Wanda Hotel Management Co. in a major restructuring. In a filing posted on the Hong Kong Stock Exchange, Wanda Hotel Development said it will acquire Wanda Travel for RMB6.3 billion, paid either in cash, the issue of shares and/or convertible bonds, with share prices determined by the company's closing price on Aug. 8 at HK$1.16 per share. Wanda Hotel Development will acquire Wanda Hotel Management for a cash price of RMB750 million.

In September 2017, Wanda made a foray into the high technology industry when it launched its technology start-up business accelerator project. The final 15 high technology business startups have been selected for the first Wanda Accelerator project, in order to take full advantage of Wanda's resources, introducing venture seed capital, imaginative technology goods and services, and fostering scientific and technological innovation to fund China's latest and most promising high-technologt startup companies of tomorrow.

On September 28, 2017, S&P downgraded Dalian Wanda Commercial Properties to BB.

In 2017, Wanda earned around 49% of its revenue from Dalian Wanda Commercial Properties Co. 28% or $10.85 billion, of total revenue was contributed by Wanda's  cultural unit, including movie theaters, sports and film-production.

On January 29, Tencent, Suning, JD.com, and Sunac signed strategic investment agreements with Wanda Commercial, with plans to invest about RMB 34 billion to acquire Wanda Commercial's 14% equity interest.

On February 5, Wanda Group signed a strategic investment agreement with Alibaba Group and Cultural Investment Holdings. The 2 parties will invest 7.8 billion yuan for Wanda Film Holding's 12.77% stake. Of which, Alibaba invests 4.68 billion yuan and CIS invests 3.12 billion yuan, becoming the second and third largest shareholders after the transaction. Wanda Group remains the controlling shareholder with 48.09% of shares in Wanda Film.

On April 28 2018, the Qingdao Movie Metropolis, a nearly RMB 50 billion industrial investment project, was completed after four years and seven months of construction. The Qingdao Movie Metropolis covers a land area of 166 hectares. According to plans, its production zone will have 52 high-tech studios, including 30 completed in the first phase and 10 under construction in the second phase, including the world's largest studio measuring 10,000 sq. m., the world's only integrated outdoor and indoor underwater studio, a comprehensive costumes and props workshop, and a world-leading post-production workshop, among others.

In May 2018, Wanda, Tencent and Gaopeng launch Internet technology company agreed together tp to build on the “new consumption” model. The three parties will launch an internet technology joint venture (JV) to build a world-class new consumption model that will integrate both online and offline businesses. Among the three companies, the breakdown of the JV's shareholdings is as follows: Wanda Group's Wanda Commercial Management Group (51%), Tencent (42.48%), and Gaopeng (6.52%).

Initial public offering
In December 2014, Dalian Wanda Commercial Properties, the group's property division, raised $3.7 billion in an initial public offering on the Hong Kong Stock Exchange, the "most money a real estate company has raised in the public markets". Windfall profits from the IPO made founder Wang Jianlin worth more than $25 billion, effectively making him one of China's richest businessmen.

In 2016, the group sought to privatize Dalian Wanda Commercial Properties less than 18 months after the unit's listing on the stock exchange. Standard & Poor was concerned that the move would weaken Wanda Commercial's transparency.

Sports
On January 20, 2015, it was reported that Wang Jianlin was buying a 20% stake in the La Liga club Atlético Madrid. The purchase was finalised March 31, 2015, when the company Wanda Madrid Investment, a subsidiary of Dalian Wanda Group, officially become a partial owner of Atlético Madrid after gaining control of 726,707 shares, representing a 20% ownership stake. The purchase price was €44,983,163.30, or €61.90 per share. The Group sold 17% of its stake to Israeli businessman Idan Ofer on 14 February 2018 for an undisclosed amount.

In February 2015, Dalian Wanda won an auction to purchase Infront Sports & Media, a sports marketing company based in Zug, Switzerland, for $1.2 billion. Infront distributes broadcasting rights for some of the world's biggest sporting events; for example, it has the exclusive sales rights to broadcast FIFA's events from 2015 to 2022, including the 2018 and 2022 World Cups. According to Wang Jianlin, "the acquisition is expected to help boost sports in China and increase Wanda’s influence in global sports". 

In August 2015, Dalian Wanda has acquired World Triathlon Corporation, an American sports promotion company promoting and licensing various triathlon competitions including the Ironman, for $650 million.

In November 2015, it was announced that Dalian Wanda established a sports division within its company, which will house the entirety of the Wanda Group's portfolio of sports-related assets.

In March 2016, FIFA announced that Wanda would be a major sponsor for international events until 2030. In September of the same year, Wanda Group announced a media and sponsorship deal with Badminton World Federation through its subsidiary, Infront Sports & Media.

In June 2017 it purchased Competitor Group (operator of the Rock 'n' Roll Marathon Series). Also that year they purchased the naming rights for the Estadio de la Comunidad de Madrid, home of association football club Atlético Madrid, which was renamed the Wanda Metropolitano.

In late February 2018, Wanda Group took control of Chinese Super League team Dalian Professional, though the decision was not officially announced. Wanda also signed Yannick Carrasco and Nicolas Gaitan from Atlético Madrid right after selling the club's shares.

Wanda Group was also one of the organizer/sponsors of the Tour of Guangxi.

Operations
Wanda Group has its headquarters in the Wanda Plaza in Beijing's Chaoyang District, where it moved in 2009. In May 2015, Dalian Wanda Group announced that it was in the process of relocating its corporate headquarters to Shanghai, which will become the third Chinese city to host the company's headquarters.

As of December 31, 2016, Dalian Wanda owned 185 Wanda Plazas, 90 hotels, 3,947 cinema screens throughout China.

In 2013, the company's assets totaled 380 billion yuan ($62.8 billion), its annual income reached 186.6 billion yuan ($30.8 billion) and net profits exceeded 12.5 billion yuan ($2.06 billion).

In early 2014, Wanda bought the property of One Beverly Hills, and later overcame the exit of its local development partner, as well as bitter objections and lawsuits filed by Israeli-American entrepreneur Beny Alagem, owner of the Beverly Hilton next door. After Wanda came under fire from Beijing regulators in 2017 over its aggressive overseas dealmaking, its local development partner on project One Beverly Hills walked away. Wanda sold this project in 2017.

By January 2017, Dalian Wanda Group was the largest film exhibitor in China, with Shanghai Film Group in second.

In July 2017, the Chinese Central Government introduced new measures that bar state-owned banks from providing new loans to private Chinese firms to curb their foreign expansion. According to media reports, the measures were approved directly by General Secretary Xi Jinping. Next to Wanda Group, the measures also targeted HNA Group Co., Anbang Insurance Group as well as Fosun International Ltd. Chairman Wang Jianlin responded by announcing that the company will focus on investing into the domestic market, and sold $9.4 billion worth of assets, including 77 hotels and a 91 percent stake in 13 theme parks to a smaller Chinese competitor.

In October 2018, Dalian Wanda exited the domestic Chinese theme park business by selling its parks management companies to Sunac for 6.3 billion yuan ($900 million). The deal included the film and TV studios that Wanda constructed in Qingdao.

Sponsorships
Since 2011, Dalian Wanda has been the major sponsor of the Chinese Super League football league.  From 1994 to 2000, it was the primary sponsor for the Dalian Shide F.C. (then named Dalian Wanda F.C.), during which time the club won four titles in the Chinese top-tier Jia-A League.

The "China's Future Football Stars" project, kicked off in 2013, is being funded by the Wanda Group with an initial phase-I investment of at least 200 million yuan (approximately $32.5 million), the biggest sponsorship in domestic youth sports development since 1949. The program will see 30 young footballers sent to Spain each year for a three-year training program that will consist of football training, as well as education in Spanish language and local culture.

On March 18, 2016, Wanda signed a deal with FIFA to provide sponsorship at the next four World Cup competitions, up until 2030. Although it is still unclear as to how much money has changed hands, and also which Wanda Subsidiaries will be appearing. This deal makes Wanda the first Chinese First-Tier FIFA Sponsor.

On December 9, 2016, Wanda signed a deal with Atlético Madrid to have the new stadium named after the Wanda Group. The new stadium's name is Wanda Metropolitano. At the time of deal, Wanda Group owned 20% of the Spanish football club.

In September 2019, the IAAF announced in Doha that the Wanda Group will become the title partner of the Diamond League for ten years from 2020. As part of this collaboration, Infront, a Wanda Sports Group company, has signed a five-year agreement with the IAAF and the Diamond League for the international media rights to the elite track and field circuit in 2025.

See also
 Chinese property bubble (2005–11)
 Real estate in China

References

External links
  
 Company website (Chinese)

 
Chinese brands
Chinese companies established in 1988
Cinema chains in China
Companies based in Beijing
Conglomerate companies of China
Construction and civil engineering companies of China
Entertainment companies established in 1988
Entertainment companies of China
Financial services companies of China
Health care companies of China
Holding companies established in 1988
Holding companies of China
Hospitality companies of China
Hospitality industry brands
Investment companies of China
Manufacturing companies established in 1988
Manufacturing companies of China
Mass media companies of China
Construction and civil engineering companies established in 1988
Privately held companies of China
Real estate companies of China
Retail companies of China
Sports event promotion companies
Technology companies established in 1988
Technology companies of China